99.1 Max FM (DXJC 99.1 MHz) is an FM station owned by Rizal Memorial Colleges Broadcasting Corporation and operated by Christian Media Management, a subsidiary of Laforteza Group of Companies. Its studios and transmitter are located along Ramon Magsaysay St., Digos.

References

External links
One Radio Digos FB Page

Radio stations in Davao del Sur
Radio stations established in 2013